"Dark Corridor" is a 1965 Australian TV play. It was an original play by Brisbane writer Trevor Nielsen.

It screened as part of Wednesday Theatre. Australian TV drama was relatively rare at the time.

Plot
The action takes place at a roadside cafe along a South Australian high way. A married woman arrives, claiming she has lost her memory. Then her husband arrives, claiming she is faking amnesia and that his wife tried to kill him.

Cast
 Betty Lucas
 Michael Thomas
 Judeth Duck

Production
The production was shot in Adelaide.

References

1965 television plays
1965 Australian television episodes
1960s Australian television plays
Wednesday Theatre (season 1) episodes